Tan Sri Datuk Abdul Ghani bin Minhat  (Jawi: عبدالغاني منحة;
‎ 23 December 1935 – 28 September 2012) was a football player who represented the team Selangor FA and Negeri Sembilan FA in the 1950s until the late 1960s. He played as a striker and winger while representing Malaya and Malaysia. He was known as the Raja Bola (Malay for King of ball) and is considered one of Malaysia's greatest football players.

Early life
Tan Sri Datuk Abdul Ghani Minhat was born on 23 December 1935 in Kampung Solok,  Rantau, Negeri Sembilan. Ghani later attended Princess Road School (now Sekolah Kebangsaan Jalan Raja Muda) at the age of 10 in 1945. He represented the school football team and only played bare footed. Two years later, Ghani attended Sekolah St. John's Kuala Lumpur and continued to play for the school team. In 1951, his talent was spotted by local police officers who later gave him his first ever football boots. In that time, only professional footballers can afford football boots as it was very expensive during the late 1950s.

Career
At the age of 17, his talent was later spotted by police officers who later invited Ghani to play with the Police Depot Football Team in the Selangor League. He was asked to play in the left wing position, even though he was right footed. He used this opportunity to develop his left footed skill.

In 1955, Ghani was chosen to play with Selangor FA in their attempt to win the HMS Malaya Cup for the first time in 6 years. Selangor faced Singapore in the 1956 Malaya Cup final. Ghani help Selangor beat Singapore 2–1 with Ghani scoring one goal to give Selangor win. His performance was praised by his teammates. Shortly after the match, he was called up by national coach, Neoh Boon Hean to represent the Malaya national team in a friendly against Cambodia.

Ghani continued to play for Selangor over the years and Selangor was considered the best club in Malaya with the name The Red Giants. Ghani, alongside M. Chandran, Stanley Gabrielle, Robert Choe and Arthur Koh, Selangor was a very powerful and feared team across Malaysia and Singapore.

One of his most invaluable experiences was being sent on attachments to gain experiences and undergo better training to several clubs in England (West Ham United, Arsenal, Spurs), Wales (Cardiff City) and Germany (Eintracht Frankfurt) in 1962.

In 1967, Ghani help Selangor to qualify the first ever 1967 Asian Club Championship. They manage to go in the finals after beating Tungsten Mining FC of South Korea. The Israeli club Hapoel Tel Aviv manage to overcome Selangor by beating Ghani side 2–1 in Bangkok. However, Selangor was praised by the Football Association of Malaysia by being the first team to qualify the finals in the Asian Club Championship.

Ghani officially retired in 1968 with the 1968 Malaysia Cup final being Ghani's last match in football. Selangor won with a big margin 8–1.

International career
Abdul Ghani first played for the Malaya national team when he was named among the 17 players which represent Malaya in the 1956 AFC Asian Cup qualification, together with the youngster Ray Crawford. On 17 March 1956, Ghani's first appearance with the national team was very impressive when Ghani scored an amazing seven goals to helping Malaya beat Cambodia 9–2.

The following year, he scored his first goal in the first ever edition, inaugural 1957 Pestabola Merdeka from an amazing 40 meters rocket shot against Vietnam in the tournament held at the Padang TPCA, Princess Road in 1957. But the Ghani was disappointed after failing to win the trophy for his country after Hong Kong emerged as champions. Ghani managed to overcome his disappointment in 1958 when he helped the national squad won the 1958 Pestabola Merdeka after being the group champions above Hong Kong and Indonesia.

Ghani then helped Malaya to retain the title Pestabola Merdeka in 1959 after beating Indonesia 2–1. He later received the title 'King of ball' from Football Association of Selangor (FAS), a title later used by anyone to refer to him for his brilliant performance for Malaya.

He completed his hat-trick in the 1960 Pestabola Merdeka. Malaya eventually shared the title with Asian Giants, South Korea. On 15 August 1960, he was selected members to form the AFC Asian All-Stars tour of Europe, which never materialized. In 1961, Ghani help the national team's to won the gold medal in the 1961 SEAP Games (now SEA Games) in Rangoon, the Burmese (now Myanmar) after beating the Burma in the finals.

Ghani helped Malaya to won the 1962 Asian Games bronze medal after beating South Vietnam 4–1.

After the defunct of Malaya national team in 1963, a combined team with the combination of players from Federation of Malaya and Singapore under the name of new nation, Malaysia was proposed by Tunku Abdul Rahman to compete at the 1963 Merdeka Tournament. Ghani was selected as the first captain of Malaysia national team. Ghani officially retired from international football after the Merdeka Cup in 1966.

Coaching career
After his retirement, he was sent to Japan by the Football Association of Malaysia to attend a FIFA Coaching School being the first ever Malaysian to have an official training from FIFA. He finally received his FIFA coaching license in 1969. He was appointed to be the coach the national team in 1969. Ghani managed the national team on an on-off basis starting from 1969 Merdeka Tournament. His last involvement with the national is at the 1976 Olympic Games qualification in Jakarta.

After only coaching the national team, he later coached his favourite team, Selangor in 1970. In 1971, he became the first player and coach to win the Malaysia Cup after being the team coach and also playing in the final and the semi-finals. He again led Selangor Malaysia's Cup victory over Perak 3–0 in 1972. He then resigned as coach in 1973 because his main concentration was on business instead of coaching.

10 years later, Ghani returned as coach for Selangor after replacing Chow Kwai Lam in 1983. But his coaching career with Selangor only lasted three seasons after being sacked after failing to help the team win the Malaysia Cup in 1985 despite the successful season leading Selangor to win the 1984 Malaysia Cup after a 3–1 victory over Pahang. After Ghani left as coach, he returned doing business.

In 2004, he returned to Selangor but this time as a Coaching Adviser for the Football Association of Selangor (FAS). He later resigned from the Football Association of Selangor and agreed moved to his birthplace and became a Coaching Adviser for Negeri Sembilan. He resigned later around 2007 after 2006–07 Season ended.

Death
He died on 28 September 2012, due to the complications after undergoing coronary bypass surgery at National Heart Institute, in Kuala Lumpur. A. Ghani leaves behind wife Puan Sri Tengku Aishah Tengku Ibrahim, two sons and two daughters.

Career statistics

International goals

Malaya
Scores and results list Malaya's goal tally first.

Malaysia
Scores and results list Malaysia's goal tally first.

Honours

As player
Source:

National Team
Malaya
 Merdeka Tournament:
 Winners(3): 1958, 1959, 1960
 Southeast Asian Peninsular Games
 Gold Medal: 1961
 Asian Games
 Bronze Medal: 1962

Club
Selangor
 HMS Malaya Cup:
Winners(7): 1956, 1959, 1961, 1962, 1963, 1966, 1968
 FAM Cup
Winners(6): 1953, 1954, 1960, 1962, 1961, 1962
 Asian Club Championship:
Runners-up: 1967

Individual
 1956 AFC Asian Cup qualification top scorer: 10 goals
 FAS King of ball (Raja Bola) Award: 1959
 National Sportsman: 1959
 OCM Hall of Fame: 2004
 FAM Special Award: 2012
 Goal.com The best Malaysia XI of all time: 2020
IFFHS Men's All Time Malaysia Dream Team: 2022

Records
 Malaya all-time top scorer: 58 goals
 The first player from outside Europe and the first player from Asia to reach 50 goals for men's national teams: 15 December 1961
 The fifth player to reach 50 goals for men's national teams after Imre Schlosser(1917), Poul Nielsen(1925), Ferenc Puskás(1952) and Sándor Kocsis(1954): 1961
 The longest international scoring series: 11 Matches in 1961-1962 
One of the four players who had averages more than one goal per match in international and having scored more than 50 goals after Sandor Kocsis with 75 goals in 68 matches (1.1), Gerd Müller with 68 goals in 62 matches (1.1) and Poul Nielsen with 52 goals in 38 matches (1.37): 58 goals in 57 matches (1.02)
 One of the three players who had scored four goals in a Malaysia Cup final after Lee Ah Loke(1952) and N. Thanabalan(1968): 1963

As coach
Selangor
 Malaysia Cup:
Winners(3): 1971, 1972, 1984
Malaysia
 King's Cup:
Winners(1): 1972
 Merdeka Tournament:
Winners(1): 1973
Malaysia B
 South Vietnam Independence Cup:
Winners(1): 1971

Orders 
  :
  Member of the Order of the Defender of the Realm (AMN) (1967)
  Commander of the Order of Meritorious Service (PJN) – Datuk (2009)
  Commander of the Order of Loyalty to the Crown of Malaysia (PSM) – Tan Sri (2012)
  :
  Knight Companion of the Order of the Crown of Pahang (DIMP) – Dato' (2000)
  :
  Knight Companion of the Order of Sultan Salahuddin Abdul Aziz Shah (DSSA) – Dato' (2001)

See also
 List of men's footballers with 50 or more international goals

References

External links
 Hall of Fame = Dato’ Hj Abd Ghani Minhat
 Arkib Negara – Dato’ Abdul Ghani Minhat

Malaysian footballers
Malaysia international footballers
1935 births
2012 deaths
Selangor FA players
Asian Games bronze medalists for Malaysia
Asian Games medalists in football
Footballers at the 1958 Asian Games
Footballers at the 1962 Asian Games
Medalists at the 1962 Asian Games
People from Negeri Sembilan
Malaysian people of Malay descent
Southeast Asian Games medalists in football
Southeast Asian Games bronze medalists for Malaysia
Association football forwards
Commanders of the Order of Loyalty to the Crown of Malaysia
Commanders of the Order of Meritorious Service
Members of the Order of the Defender of the Realm
Competitors at the 1959 Southeast Asian Peninsular Games